Bertaux may refer to:

People 
 Daniel Bertaux (1939–), French sociologist
 Hélène Bertaux (1825–1909), French sculptor and women's rights advocate
 Jean Duplessis-Bertaux (1747–1819), French artist
 Pierre Bertaux (1907–1986), French resistance fighter and scholar of German literature

Other 
 Maison Bertaux, a French pâtisserie in London
 Ouled Hamla, a town in Algeria called Bertaux from about 1830 to 1962